Mateo Martinić Beroš (born 20 October 1931) is a Chilean historian, politician and lawyer of Croatian descent. He has primarily dealt with the history of the Magallanes Region. He entered the University of Chile in 1953 studying briefly pedagogy before moving on to study law and then continued his law studies in the Catholic University of Chile. He finally became a lawyer in 1983. From 1964 to 1970 he served as intendant of Magallanes Region. He received the National History Award in 2000.

Together with botanist Edmundo Pisano Martnic was among the founding members of Instituto de la Patagonia which in 1985 became integrated into the University of Magallanes.

Books of Mateo Martinic 
Presencia de Chile en la Patagonia Austral: 1843-1879 (1971)
Magallanes, síntesis de tierra y gentes (1972)
Crónica de las tierras del sur del canal Beagle (1974) y (2005) (segunda edición revisada y aumentada) 
Origen y desarrollo de Punta Arenas entre 1848-1898 (1974)
Recorriendo Magallanes Antiguo con Theodor Ohlsen (1975) y (2005)
Historia del Estrecho de Magallanes (1977)
La inmigración yugoeslava en Magallanes (1978)
Los alemanes en Magallanes (1981)
La Tierra de los Fuegos: historia, geografía, sociedad, economía (1982) y (2009) 
Última Esperanza en el tiempo (1983) y (2000)
Magallanes de antaño (1985)
Nogueira: el pionero (1986) 
Punta Arenas en su primer medio siglo: 1848-1898 (1988)
Magallanes 1921-1952: inquietud y crisis (1988)
Historia de la Región Magallánica (1992) y (2006) (segunda edición revisada y aumentada) 
Historia del petróleo en Magallanes (1993)
Los aónikenk: historia y cultura (1995)
Faros del Estrecho de Magallanes (coautorado con Julio Fernández Mallo) (1996)
Punta Arenas sesquicentenaria (1848-1998): una visión de su evaluación de década en década (1999)
La inmigración croata en Magallanes (1999)
Cartografía Magallánica: 1523-1945 (1999)
Rey Don Felipe. Acontecimientos históricos (2000)
Menéndez y Braun: prohombres patagónicos (2001)
Marinos de a caballo: exploraciones terrestres de la Armada de Chile en la Patagonia Austral y la Tierra del Fuego. 1877-1897 (2002)
Río Verde: su historia y su gente (coautorado con Alfredo Prieto, Manuel Arroyo y Rodrigo Cárdenas) (2002) y (2011)
Estrecho de Magallanes: puerta de Chile (coautorado con Mónica Oportot) (2003) 
Mujeres magallánicas (2003)
Archipiélago Patagónico: la última frontera (2004)
De la Trapananda al Áysen (2005)
Los alemanes en la Patagonia Chilena (2005)
Los británicos en la Región Magallánica (2007)
Las comunicaciones a distancia en Magallanes: su evolución a lo largo del tiempo (coautorado con Claudio Buratovic) (2007) 
Plüschow y Dreblow: águilas alemanas en el cielo austral (2008)
La medicina en Magallanes (2009)
El carbón en Magallanes: historia y futuro (2010)
Palacio Sara Braun: ícono patrimonial de Punta Arenas (coautorado con Dante Baeriswyl) (2010)
Monseñor Giacomini: paladín de magallanidad (2011)
El occidente fueguino: todavía una incógnita (2011)
A la hora del crepúsculo: recuerdos de un hombre común (2011)
Bio-bibliografía (2011)
Testimonios de Magallanes: miradas entrecruzadas (coautorado con Patricia Arancibia Clavel) (2012)

Toponymy 

Lago Mateo Martinic Cordillera Darwin, Tierra del Fuego  Expedición Neozelandesa a la Tierra del Fuego 1971-72 Homologado por el Instituto Geográfico Militar Carta Nacional de Chile escala 1:500.000, Hoja “Punta Arenas” , edición 1975 (1971).

Cerro Martinic (Southern Patagonian Ice Field, sector SE) Expedición Francesa Andes de Patagonie 1982-83 Enfer Blanc de Patagonie (Editions Fernand Nathan, Paris, 1985).

Isla Martinic (Murray Channel, Puerto Corriente) Servicio Hidrografía y Oceanografía de la Armada de Chile. Resolución SHOA Ordinario N°13.042/7/30/VRS de 17-XI-2008 y Carta N°13123 "Puerto Corriente", escala 1:15.000, edición diciembre 2008.

References

Sources
 Mateo Martinic Beros (1931-), Memoria Chilena. 
 Obras de Mateo Martinic digitalizadas en Memoria Chilena
 Sitio oficial del Instituto de la Patagonia
 Origen y desarrollo del Instituto de la Patagonia. Una perspectiva de 40 años. Editorial de Mateo Martinic. Anales del Instituto de la Patagonia. v.37. n.1. Punta Arenas. 2009.
Publicaciones de la Universidad de Magallanes
Revista Magallania (versión online)
Nuestro.cl: Mateo Martinic: Premio Bicentenario 2006.
Nuestro.cl: La magallanidad de Chile. Discurso pronunciado por Mateo Martinic en la ceremonia de entrega del Premio Bicentenario 2006.

People from Punta Arenas
20th-century Chilean historians
20th-century Chilean male writers
21st-century Chilean historians
21st-century Chilean male writers
Chilean people of Croatian descent
1931 births
Living people
20th-century Chilean lawyers
21st-century Chilean lawyers